Allan MacPherson Fraser (July 9, 1906 – November 16, 1969) was a Canadian, educator, politician and archivist. Fraser represented the electoral district of St. John's East in the House of Commons of Canada from 1953 to 1957. He was a member of the Liberal Party of Canada.

Fraser was born in Inverness, Scotland and died in St. John's, Newfoundland.

See also 
 22nd Canadian Parliament

References

1906 births
1969 deaths
Members of the House of Commons of Canada from Newfoundland and Labrador
Liberal Party of Canada MPs